Greg Holben is an Australian former professional rugby league footballer who played in the 1970s and 1980s. A Queensland State of Origin representative utility back, he played his in the Brisbane Rugby League for the Eastern Suburbs (winning the 1977 and 1978 grand finals with them) and Brothers clubs.

Playing career
An Eastern Suburbs junior, Holben was also a goal-kicker. He played for the first grade side that won the 1977 Brisbane Rugby League Grand Final, kicking four goals.

He scored the dramatic last-minute try to win the 1978 Brisbane Rugby Grand Final for Easts.

Holben was selected for Queensland as a reserve in Game II of the 1982 State of Origin series.

Post-playing
Holben took up coaching after retiring from the playing field and later became the Chairman of Selectors at the Eastern Suburbs Tigers, a position he held for several years.

The Easts Tigers club celebrated its 75th birthday reunion by naming an all-star 25 at an "outstanding" dinner in 2008, which included Holben.

References

Sportsmen from Queensland
Rugby league players from Brisbane
Australian rugby league players
Eastern Suburbs Tigers players
Queensland Rugby League State of Origin players
Living people
1951 births
Rugby league five-eighths
People educated at Brisbane State High School